Satyam is a 1976 Indian Tamil-language film, directed by S. A. Kannan and written by Vietnam Veedu Sundaram. The film stars Sivaji Ganesan, Kamal Haasan, Manjula, Devika and Jayachitra. The film has Haasan playing the younger brother of Ganesan. It was adapted from Kannan's play Vidhi.

Plot 
Dharmalingam is the chieftain of his village known for keeping his word and his pacifism. His wife Sivakami, educated brother Kumaran and Kumaran's betrothed, Vani, live together happily. Gowri, Kumaran's college mate who also happens to be the richest woman in the village falls in love with Kumaran.

Sokkanathan is Gowri's guardian and is classist wanting to keep the poor poor so that they stay under him. Due to his machinations, the poor villagers' house get burnt. Seeing Dharmalingan's plight and tears, Gowri promises to rebuild their houses and give them the lands she has in excess much to chagrin on Sokkanathan. She even fires Sokkanathan upon her eighteenth birthday as her agent leaving him rudderless. Due to her beneficent nature, Dharmalingan gives her a carte blanch word that she can ask anything she wants at anytime which he will give her so long it is in his power. She uses this to her advantage and asks for Kumaran. After a huge showdown, Kumaran succumbs to pressure and marries Gowri deciding to punish his own brother and Gowri. 

He takes back everything Gowri has given and refuses to even see his brother. Vani meanwhile has taken up ascetism and starts living in temple. Kumaran gets into an major accident which causes everyone to gather together and in the end, Vani fasts to death praying to God which helps Kumaran survive at the cost of Vani's life.

Cast 
Sivaji Ganesan as Dharmalingam
Devika as Sivakami
Kamal Haasan as Kumaran
Manjula as Gowri
Jayachitra as Vani
M. N. Nambiar as Sokkanathan
S. V. Subbaiah as Vani's grandfather
Major Sundarrajan as Police Inspector (guest role)
V. K. Ramasamy as Vallinayagam
Nagesh as Pannaiyar's driver
K. K. Soundar as a villager
Karuppu Subbiah as a villager
T. K. S. Natarajan as a villager
Typist Gopu as
Neelu as
Haalam as a Dancer
Pushpamala

Production 
Satyam was an adaptation of the play Vidhi. The play was written by S. A. Kannan who also directed the film adaptation. Kamal Haasan was paired with Manjula which remained their only collaboration in their career.

Soundtrack 
The soundtrack was composed by K. V. Mahadevan and lyrics written by Kannadasan and Rajagopal. The song "Kalyana Kovilil" attained popularity.

Reception 
Kanthan of Kalki wrote the screenplay, which was proceeding smoothly and calmly till the interval, then reaches the fate of a ship battered by a storm; what saves the film from this accident is the unparalleled performance of the actors and actresses.

References

External links 
 

1970s Tamil-language films
1976 films
Films scored by K. V. Mahadevan
Indian films based on plays